Laying is the act of making equipment level. It usually involves moving equipment in small motions so that spirit levels are centralised in all planes. Movement is usually done by small worm gears or other fine setting devices for accurate small movements, together with coarser gears to allow large swings in motion for quick movement between different settings.

Equipment that requires laying before it can be used accurately includes:
 theodolites
 guns and howitzers in indirect fire (gun laying)

Artillery operation
Machines